The 2013 Campeonato Cearense de Futebol was the 99th season of top professional football league in the state of Ceará, Brazil. The competition began on January 5 and ended on May 19. Ceará won the championship for the 42nd time and 3rd since 2011, while São Benedito and Maracanã were relegated.

Format
The championship has three stages. On the first stage, all teams excluding those who are playing in 2013 Copa do Nordeste play a double round robin. The best six teams qualifies to the second stage.

On the second stage, the teams are joined by the clubs from Ceará who were playing on Copa Nordeste. The teams then play a double round robin again, where the best four teams qualifies to the final stage. In the final stage, it's a playoff with four teams.

The champion and the best team on first stage qualifies to the 2014 Copa do Brasil. The champion and the runner-up qualify to the 2014 Copa do Nordeste. The best team who isn't on Campeonato Brasileiro Série A, Série B or Série C qualifies to Série D. The two worst teams in first stage will be relegated.

Participating teams

First stage

Results

Second stage
The six teams from the First stage are joined by Ceará and Fortaleza who were playing on 2013 Copa do Nordeste.

Results

Final stage

Semifinals

First leg

Second leg

Finals

Ceará Sporting Club won due to better campaign.

References

Cearense
2013